José María Pérez may refer to:
José María Pérez de Urdininea (1784–1865), Bolivian politician, the third President of Bolivia
José María Pérez Gay (1944–2013), Mexican academic, writer, translator and diplomatic
José María Pérez, Cuba is a small town in Villa Clara, Cuba